Cooperstown is an unincorporated community located in the town of Cooperstown, Manitowoc County, Wisconsin, United States.

References

Unincorporated communities in Manitowoc County, Wisconsin
Unincorporated communities in Wisconsin